The 2015–16 Women's CEV Cup was the 44th edition of the European CEV Cup volleyball club tournament, the former "Top Teams Cup".

Participating teams
The number of participants on the basis of ranking list for European Cup Competitions. The list shows the participating teams at the start of the competition, four more teams joined later during the Challenge phase.

Main phase

16th Final
1st leg 27–29 October 2015
2nd leg 10–12 November 2015
The losing teams of this stage qualified to the CEV Women's Challenge Cup main phase.

8th Final
1st leg 8–10 December 2015
2nd leg 15–17 December 2015

4th Final
1st leg 19–21 January 2016
2nd leg 26–28 January 2016

Challenge phase
In this stage of the competition, the four qualified teams of the Main phase were joined by the four teams with best third-placed finish from the 2015–16 CEV Women's Champions League pool stage. The following teams competed at this stage of the competition.

1st leg 9–11 February 2016
2nd leg 23–25 February 2016

Final phase

Semifinals
1st leg 8 March 2016
2nd leg 12 March 2016

Finals
1st leg 29 March 2016
2nd leg 2 April 2016

Awards

References

External links
 CEV Cup 15-16

Women's CEV Cup
CEV Cup
CEV Cup